Procambarus apalachicolae, the coastal flatwoods crayfish, is a species of crayfish in family Cambaridae. It is endemic to Florida, and is listed as an endangered species on the IUCN Red List.

References

Cambaridae
Endemic fauna of Florida
Freshwater crustaceans of North America
Crustaceans described in 1942
Taxa named by Horton H. Hobbs Jr.
Taxonomy articles created by Polbot